Frederick Armstrong may refer to:

 Frederick C. Armstrong (1896–1918), Canadian First World War flying ace
 Frederick Thomas Armstrong (1907–1990), Canadian politician